The 2005 term of the Supreme Court of the United States began October 3, 2005, and concluded October 1, 2006. The table illustrates which opinion was filed by each justice in each case and which justices joined each opinion.

Table key

2005 term opinions

2005 term membership and statistics
This was the first term of Chief Justice Roberts, who was confirmed following the death of Chief Justice William Rehnquist on September 3. Justice O'Connor also retired midterm on January 31, 2006, when she was replaced by Justice Alito.  The Court's membership had not changed for the previous eleven terms.

Notes

References

 

Lists of United States Supreme Court opinions by term